Ulster Architectural Heritage Society was founded "to promote appreciation and enjoyment of good architecture of all periods and encourage the conservation, restoration and re-use of Ulster's built heritage to regenerate and sustain our communities".

History
It was founded in 1967, mainly under the impetus of Sir Charles Brett, to counter threats to the survival of Ulster's historic architecture. When the UAHS was founded there was no statutory listing of buildings in Northern Ireland and its campaigns led to the establishment of listed building legislation for Northern Ireland in 1972. Subsequently, historic buildings grants, conservation areas and a public buildings record were all developed under the auspices of the Department of the Environment (Northern Ireland), in no small part due to the UAHS.

Campaigns

In February 2015 it was reported that the Department of the Environment proposed delisting 17 Belfast buildings, including the historic Kelly's Cellars, subject to review by the Historic Buildings Council and Belfast City Council. UAHS declared that "despite their present condition, all buildings currently proposed for delisting contribute to the value of Belfast’s fragile built heritage and are important resources to promote tourism, economic investment and social regeneration". In March 2015 Belfast city councillors vowed to fight the Department of Environment over plans to remove protective listed status from Kelly's Cellars, now one of eight properties which the department has indicated that it plans to delist.

Events
UAHS also organises a range of architecturally-related events.

Register of Built Heritage at Risk Northern Ireland
A comprehensive online register of Built Heritage at Risk Northern Ireland (BHARNI) was compiled in partnership with the Northern Ireland Environment Agency and highlights almost 500 buildings and monuments of architectural and historic interest whose future seems threatened and may be suitable for restoration and repair.

References

External links
Ulster Architectural Heritage Society
Buildings at risk in Northern Ireland (NI Environment Agency)

Architecture organisations based in the United Kingdom
Organisations based in Belfast
1967 establishments in Northern Ireland